The Naviculales are an order of diatoms.

Family
According to the GBIF, the order has the following families; 

 Amphipleuraceae (contains 1k species)
 Berkeleyaceae (144)
 Brachysiraceae (112)
 Cavinulaceae (15)
 Cosmioneidaceae (7)
 Diadesmidaceae (303)
 Diploneidaceae (450)
 Gomphonemaceae (12)
 Metascolioneidaceae (3)
 Naviculaceae (9k)
 Neidiaceae (676)
 Phaeodactylaceae (2)
 Pinnulariaceae (3k)
 Plagiotropidaceae (50)
 Pleurosigmataceae (881)
 Proschkiniaceae (36)
 Scolioneidaceae (1)
 Scoliotropidaceae (59)
 Sellaphoraceae (250)
 Stauroneidaceae (1k)

Unplaced genera
There are 5 genera that are incertae sedis.
Boreozonacola  (4)
Brevilinea  (2)
Cholnokyella  (1)
Playaensis  (3)
Rexlowea  (2)

Figures in brackets are approx. how many species per genus.

References

 
Diatom orders